Guitar Hero Live is a 2015 music video game developed by FreeStyleGames and published by Activision. It is the first title in the Guitar Hero series since it went on hiatus after 2011, and the first game in the series available for 8th generation video game consoles (PlayStation 4, Wii U, and Xbox One). The game was released worldwide on 20 October 2015 for these systems as well as the PlayStation 3, Xbox 360, and iOS devices including the Apple TV.

The title is considered a reboot of the series; instead of using a five-button guitar-shaped game controller, the game shipped with a six-button controller, arranged in two rows of three aimed to provide more realistic fingering positions than the five-button controller. The game includes 42 songs on the game's disc, presented in sets using full motion video taken from the first-person perspective of the lead guitarist as the background visuals to create an immersive experience. Guitar Hero Live does not use traditional downloadable content to expand the game and is not backward compatible with previous songs from Guitar Hero games. Instead, the game includes the online Guitar Hero TV (GHTV) mode modeled after music video channels that players can jump in or out of at any time, playing through ongoing songs in a curated fashion. GHTV, through in-game rewards and microtransactions, supports the ability to play any song in the library, perform Premium shows where the newest tracks to GHTV will be found, or even unlock all features for a 24-hour period as part of a Party Pass. Two hundred songs were available at the release of the game, with more added over time, averaging about six brand new songs each week.

FreeStyleGames selected on-disc songs from a wider variety of music genres beyond rock music as to provide challenging guitar tracks for players, while their approach to licensing of songs for GHTV enabled them to attract more musical acts to offer their music. Game reviewers found the on-disc soundtrack to be weak as it focused too much on more recent musical acts, while praising the wider variety across a larger time period that GHTV offered.

On-disc soundtrack
Forty-two songs are featured on disc as part of the game's main "GH Live" career mode. Players progress through the career mode by playing one of several continuous sets of three to five songs, with each set presented as part of a concert performance. During a set, the game shows the note highway, the on-screen fretboard which represents the notes the player should play in time to the music, and other gameplay elements. This is shown atop live-action footage taken from the first-person perspective of the lead guitar player of one of several fictional bands, performing on stage and watching the reaction of the crowd and their bandmates. The live-action footage is manipulated by the game to reflect how well the player is performing. Once the player has completed a set, all songs from that set are available in a quickplay mode, allowing the player to perform a single song at a time which they can use to practice the song or attempt to achieve a better score.

In selecting the on-disc songs, FreeStyleGames recognized that engaging guitar tracks are not strictly limited to rock music, and included other genres into the mix. According to designer Jim Norris, their selection process began with identifying songs that would be expected by players to be on a Guitar Hero title, and then determining which of those songs which they could license. Once they had obtained the license, FreeStyleGames would mark up the song for the note highways and determined how much fun these songs would be to play. Finally, they balanced the song selection in the game to give players a combination of songs they know and those they may not recognize but would be enjoyable.

The table below lists the on-disc songs, including the venue and fictional band that are used in the set where the song is included.

GHTV

Forgoing the downloadable content model used in previous Guitar Hero games, Guitar Hero Live adds songs to the game via Guitar Hero TV (GHTV), an online game mode offered free of charge in Guitar Hero Live. Instead of playing the immersive first-person view that the main career mode presents, songs on GHTV are played over the music video or footage of the band playing at a concert. Songs on GHTV are normally offered in a curated rotation, similar to a music video channel, allowing the player to drop in and out, but the player can use collected in-game rewards or use microtransactions to play any available song outside of this rotation. FreeStyleGames found that this approach, in contrast to the traditional downloadable content model, made it easier to secure licensing rights with artists to use their songs, as well as a throwback to the heyday of music video channels like MTV.

Launch songs
Two hundred songs were initially available on GHTV on the game's release on 20 October 2015.

Added songs
New songs have been added to GHTV on a regular weekly basis with approximately six new songs a week since the game's release. While some songs are directly added to the on-demand and curated lineup, several other songs are introduced to GHTV through Premium Shows, typically offering three songs by a single artist or within a musical theme. Some Premium Shows, such as those for Avenged Sevenfold or Fall Out Boy, use songs and footage taken live from the  band's current tour.

A player can access a Premium Show either through playing specific songs already in the GHTV catalog or through microtransactions. Completing Premium Shows can earn the player in-game rewards such as a decorative item for their player card or on-screen fretboard. The week after their introduction, these songs are added to the on-demand playlist, and after another week enter into the GHTVs rotation of songs. At the release of Guitar Hero Live, Activision announced plans to add 70 new songs to GHTV before the end of 2015.

Between August 2017 and April 2018, only one song was added to GHTV and on 3 June 2018, Activision confirmed that the servers will be shut down 1 December 2018.

The following table lists songs that have been added to GHTV since launch, including those released through Premium Shows and those directly added to the service.

Notes

Reception

Reviewers considered the on-disc soundtrack for Guitar Hero Live weak. Griffin McElroy of Polygon found it the "biggest disappointment" of the game given the setlist had mostly songs from 2000 or later, forgoing classic rock songs. GameSpots Scott Buttersworth stated that many of the on-disc selections are pop songs that "just aren't cut out for Guitar Hero gameplay", as they feature the same repeating guitar riff over and over. Ben Griffin of GamesRadar was more favorable of the on-disc set list, finding that the tracks represented "the music landscape as it is rather than as it was". Chris Carter of Destructoid also appreciated the soundtrack, calling it a "good spread" of songs that can appeal to everyone.

The GHTV mode earned mixed opinions, with most reviewers praising the concept. The presentation of the channels was highlighted as hearkening to the heyday of MTV, and praised for providing players with the ability to explore new music. The selection of songs for GHTV was considered very diverse, and some reviewers found the GHTV songlist to be better varied than the on-disc list, providing songs from "six-string classic" bands that work well for games like Guitar Hero. Criticism was raised on the use of microtransactions and premium shows, disallowing players to play specific tracks at any time without cost.

References

Live